Maharishi Markandeshwar (Deemed to be University, Mullana, is a deemed university at Mullana  near Ambala in the state of Haryana, India. It was founded in 1993 in the name of Maharishi Markandeshwar Ji. It offers undergraduate and post-graduate programs in fields of engineering, hospitality, management, nursing and healthcare.

Institutions
Constituent institutions on the main campus which come under this university include:
  Maharishi Markandeshwar Institute of Medical Sciences and Research
  Maharishi Markandeshwar College of Pharmacy
  Maharishi Markandeshwar College of Dental Sciences & Research
  Maharishi Markandeshwar Engineering College
  Maharishi Markandeshwar Institute of Physiotherapy & Rehabilitation
  Maharishi Markandeshwar Institute of Computer Technology & Business Management (Hotel Management)
  Maharishi Markandeshwar Institute of Computer Technology & Business Management (MCA)
  Maharishi Markandeshwar Institute of Management
  Maharishi Markandeshwar College of Nursing
  Maharishi Markandeshwar Department of Law
  Maharishi Markandeshwar Department of Agriculture

Infrastructure 
The campus includes 14 hostels and six residential blocks. It has a sports complex with seven gyms, a swimming pool and one game arena. The campus has two shopping centers with four banks, a post office, and various eating shops. Also on campus there is an auditorium with seating capacity of about 1500.

See also

 List of medical colleges in Haryana

References

External links 
 Official website

Hospitals in Haryana
Medical colleges in Haryana
Teaching hospitals in India
Ambala district
Educational institutions established in 1993
1993 establishments in Haryana